Luca Miracoli (born 31 March 1992) is an Italian footballer who plays for  club Sangiuliano as forward.

Club career
He started his career in Valenzana, before joining Serie C side Feralpisalò for two seasons. After 17 goals in 59 matches, he made his Serie B debut with Varese, where he made 26 appearances and 3 goals. After the club relegation he joined the French team Tours, Ligue 2. He came back in Italy in 2016, signed by Carrarese.

In 2017 Miracoli joins Sambenedettese, in Serie C. After some criticism, he became top scorer of his team.

On 31 January 2019, he joined Sicula Leonzio on loan.

On 21 July 2019, he signed a 2-year contract with Como. On 31 January 2020, he returned to Feralpisalò on loan until the end of the 2019–20 season. On 29 July 2020, he moved to Feralpisalò on a permanent basis and signed a 3-year contract.

References

External links

1992 births
Living people
Footballers from Genoa
Italian footballers
Association football forwards
Serie B players
Serie C players
Valenzana Mado players
S.S.D. Varese Calcio players
FeralpiSalò players
Carrarese Calcio players
A.S. Sambenedettese players
Brescia Calcio players
A.S.D. Sicula Leonzio players
Como 1907 players
F.C. Sangiuliano City players
Ligue 2 players
Championnat National 3 players
Tours FC players
Italian expatriate footballers
Italian expatriate sportspeople in France
Expatriate footballers in France